Jørgen Matthias Christian Schiødte (20 April 1815 – 22 April 1884), or Jørgen Christian Matthias Schiødte, was a Danish entomologist, professor  and museum  curator.

Biography
Schiødte was born in Copenhagen and attended  Borgerdydskolen in Christianshavn.  From 1842,  he was employed as curator  of the Natural History Museum of Denmark and was a professor at the University of Copenhagen from 1845.

His work was widely read  "for, as Schiodte remarks: 'We accordingly look upon the subterranean faunas as small ramifications which have penetrated into the earth from the geographically limited faunas of the adjacent tracts, and which, as they extended themselves into darkness, have been accommodated to surrounding circumstances. Animals not far remote from ordinary forms, prepare the transition from light to darkness. Next follow those that are constructed for twilight; and, last of all, those destined for total darkness, and whose formation is quite peculiar.' These remarks of Schiodte's it should be understood, apply not to the same, but to distinct species." - Charles Darwin

His best known publications were 
Genera og species of Danmarks Eleutherata at tjene som fauna for denne orden og som indledning til dens anatomie og historie (1841)
Naturhistoriske bidrag til en beskrivelse of Grønland / af J. Reinhardt, J.C. Schiødte, O.A.L. Mørch, C.F. Lütken, J. Lange, H. Rink. Særskilt aftryk af tillæggene til "Grønland, geographisk og statistisk beskrevet," af H. Rink. 1857
De metamorphosi eleutheratorum observationes : bidrag til insekternes udviklingshistorie / ved J. C. Schiødte.Kjøbenhavn  Thieles Bogtrykkeri, 1861–72. online

In addition, he described numerous species of insects as well as the spider genus Liphistius.

References

Other sources

 Groll, E. K. (Hrsg.): Biografien der Entomologen der Welt : Datenbank. Version 4.15 : Senckenberg Deutsches Entomologisches Institut, 2010 

1815 births
1884 deaths
People from Copenhagen
Academic staff of the University of Copenhagen
Danish entomologists
Knights of the Order of the Dannebrog
Burials at Assistens Cemetery (Copenhagen)